Alpine Valley Resort is an all-season resort in the north central United States, located in the Town of Lafayette, Walworth County, Wisconsin.

History
Once owned by the Boschert family, part of their family farm was sold off to a developer who created the resort. Ownership has changed several times since the resort was constructed. It is currently owned by Wisconsin Resorts, Inc. Eventually, the resort grew to include an amphitheater, which became Alpine Valley Music Theatre.

It was at Alpine Valley  in 1990 that guitarist Stevie Ray Vaughan and four others were killed in a helicopter crash on the side of the ski hill. It followed a Sunday night performance with his band Double Trouble, a concert which included Eric Clapton and Robert Cray.

See also
List of ski areas and resorts in the United States

References

External links

Ski areas and resorts in Wisconsin
Tourism in Wisconsin
Buildings and structures in Walworth County, Wisconsin
Tourist attractions in Walworth County, Wisconsin
Sports in the Milwaukee metropolitan area